Reth Kwongo Dak Padiet is the current chollo king of the Shiluk Kingdom located along the left and right bank of the White Nile river in what is now South Sudan and southern Sudan.

The Chollo king Reth Kwongo Dak Padiet was airlifted to juba by the South Sudan government under the orders of President Salva Kiir when conflict broke out in the Upper Nile state.

Installation as Reth (King( 
Reth Kwongo Dak Padiet was installed as the chollo king in 1993 when he was elected to become the new Reth after the Death of Reth Anyag Aney Kur in 1992

References 

Year of birth missing (living people)
Living people